Aku Louhimies (born 3 July 1968) is a Finnish film director and screenwriter. He has directed feature films, documentary films, commercials and music videos. His international breakthrough was the 2016 serial drama Rebellion.
He has directed and produced the 2017 war film  The Unknown Soldier which is the most expensive feature film ever made in Finland.

Education
Aku attended school in the United States, graduating from Billings West High School in Montana. After he studied history at the University of Helsinki, and film directing at University of Art and Design Helsinki in Finland. Louhimies' military rank is Reserve Senior Lieutenant. He is fluent in English, Finnish, Swedish, and Spanish.

December 2019 Louhimies was promoted to an officer rank of Senior Lieutenant (in reserves) by Finnish Defence Forces.

Career

Feature films
Restless (2000) was first feature film directed by Louhimies, and after that, he has directed eight feature films, among them award-winning Frozen Land (2005), war drama Tears of April (2008), multi-narrative drama Naked Harbour (2012) and hard-hitting crime-drama 8-ball (2013).

In 2017 Louhimies worked on a World War II Drama  The Unknown Soldier  that had its premiere October 27, 2017 as a part of the official 100th anniversary of Finnish independence program. The film is based on Väinö Linna's acclaimed novel The Unknown Soldier from 1954. The international premiere was on 23 November 2017 at the Tallinn Black Nights Film Festival, followed by Ireland, Sweden, Iceland and Norway. The film was described by critics as gritty, forlorn, honest and realistic as well as a pacifist piece confronting less pleasant sides of Finnish history. The film gathered most audience of all the Finnish films in 2017. Over 1 million people saw the film in 2018 and it is still gathering audience in 2018.

Television projects
Louhimies has also directed several television projects, among others the multiple awards-winning television series Fragments (2003).

In 2019 Louhimies directed a whole season of an English language thriller series Rig 45 which will air in 2020. Starring Rune Temte, Filip Berg, Andrei Alén and Natalie Gumede. ‘Rig 45’ is one of NENT Group’s most successful original series. 
In 2016 Louhimies made his international breakthrough by directing the serial drama Rebellion for Irish broadcaster RTÉ and Netflix. The five-part television mini-series depicts fictional characters in Dublin during the 1916 Rising and it was commemorating the 100th Anniversary of the Easter Rising. The 5 parts of the series are Young Guns, To Arms, Under Siege, Surrender and The Reckoning.  The series premiered on SundanceTV in the US, on April 24, 2016 and on YLE (Finnish Broadcasting Service), on June 1, 2016. The series is available on Netflix worldwide, except in Ireland and Finland.

Other projects
Aku Louhimies has also directed short films, documentaries, music videos and commercials since 1995.

In 2004, Aku was elected Director of the Year by the Association of Finnish Film Directors. 2011-2014 he was the chairman of the association

In 2012, Louhimies accepted the role of jury member for the first Saint Petersburg international film festival and his film Naked Harbour (Vuosaari) was added to the festival's non-competition programme "Screenings in honour of filmmakers".

Criticism
In March 2018 8 female actors came forward accusing director Aku Louhimies subjected them to demeaning tactics and abuse in the work. At the 2018 Jussi Awards during his acceptance speech, after receiving the Audience Award, Louhimies apologized for his behavior and thanked everyone, who had started the process to "air the movie industry". He has also responded to the accusations in his Facebook posts.

Filmography
Omerta 6/12, 2021
The Wait (Odotus), 2021
The Unknown Soldier (Tuntematon sotilas), 2017
Rebellion (TV Mini-Series), 2016
8-ball (8-pallo), 2013
Naked Harbour (Vuosaari), 2012
Tears of April (Käsky), 2008
Frozen City (Valkoinen kaupunki), 2006
Man Exposed (Riisuttu mies), 2006
Frozen Land (Paha maa), 2005
Lovers & Leavers (Kuutamolla), 2002
Restless (Levottomat), 2000

The book Aku Louhimies — Elokuvaunelmia (Like, 2017) by non-fiction author Satu Jaatinen, examines the director's career from Restless to Unknown Soldier.

Selected awards
The Unknown Soldier (Tuntematon sotilas), 2017 Jussi Awards 2018: Best Film - Audience Award, Best Actor, Best Sound Design, Best Editing, Best Make-up
Naked Harbour (Vuosaari), 2012 Festroia International Film Festival 2012: CICAE Award
Naked Harbour (Vuosaari), 2012 Nordische Filmtage Lübeck 2012: The Interfilm Church Prize
Frozen City (Valkoinen kaupunki), 2006 Jussi Awards 2007: Best Director
Frozen City (Valkoinen kaupunki), 2006 Ghent International Film Festival 2006: Best Director
Frozen City (Valkoinen kaupunki), 2006 Karlovy Vary International Film Festival 2006: Don Quijote Award – Special Mention, FIPRESCI Prize, Label Europa Cinemas
Frozen City (Valkoinen kaupunki), 2006 Lübeck Nordic Film Days 2006: Prize of the Ecumenical Jury – Honorable Mention
Frozen Land (Paha maa), 2005 Jussi Awards 2006: Best Director, Best Script
Frozen Land (Paha maa), 2005 Athens International Film Festival 2005: Best Screenplay
Frozen Land (Paha maa), 2005 Bergen International Film Festival 2005: Jury Award
Frozen Land (Paha maa), 2005 Göteborg Film Festival 2005: Church of Sweden Film Award, FIPRESCI Prize, Nordic Film Prize
Frozen Land (Paha maa), 2005 Leeds International Film Festival 2005: Golden Owl Award
Frozen Land (Paha maa), 2005 Lübeck Nordic Film Days 2005: NDR Promotion Prize – Honorable Mention
Frozen Land (Paha maa), 2005 Moscow International Film Festival 2005: Special Jury Prize
 Irtiottoja (Fragments), 2004 Venla Awards: Best Director
Lovers & Leavers (Kuutamolla), 2002 Durango Film Festival 2003: Jury Award Best Narrative Feature
Lovers & Leavers (Kuutamolla), 2002 Cinequest San Jose Film Festival 2003: Best Feature

His 2000 film Restless was entered into the 22nd Moscow International Film Festival.

References

External links
 The official homepage of Aku Louhimies
 The Official Facebook page of Aku Louhimies
 
 The Lisa Richards Agency

Living people
Writers from Helsinki
Finnish film directors
Finnish screenwriters
1968 births